Ove Bernt Trellevik (born 15 August 1965) is a Norwegian military officer, economist, and politician for the Conservative Party. A former officer in the Royal Norwegian Navy and former mayor of Sund, he has been member of the Storting from the constituency of Hordaland since 2013.

Personal life, education and early career
Trellevik was born in Bergen on 15 August 1965, a son of Åsmund Trellevik and Anne Marie Trellevik. He was first educated as chef, and is further educated both as military officer from the Royal Norwegian Naval Academy, and economist from the Norwegian School of Economics.

From 2006 to 2010 he was assigned as special advisor for the power company BKK.

Political career
Trellevik was elected member of the municipal council of Sund from 2007 to 2015, and served as mayor in Sund from 2010 to 2013.

He was elected representative to the Parliament of Norway from Hordaland in 2013 where he was member of the Standing Committee on Business and Industry from 2013 to 2017. He was re-elected to the Storting for the periods 2017–2021 and 2021–2025, and was member of the Standing Committee on Local Government and Public Administration from 2017 to 2021, and of the Standing Committee on Energy and the Environment from 2021. He was a member of the Storting delegation to the Inter-Parliamentary Union from 2017 to 2021, and a delegate to the United Nations General Assembly from 2018 to 2019.

References 

Conservative Party (Norway) politicians
Members of the Storting
Hordaland politicians
Mayors of places in Hordaland
1965 births
Living people
21st-century Norwegian politicians